Barbara Ayisi Asher (born 12 February 1976) is a Ghanaian politician and the former Member of Parliament of Cape Coast North constituency in the Central Region of Ghana. She is a member of the New Patriotic Party and was the former deputy minister for Education in Ghana. She was appointed as the chairperson for the Women's Premier League Super Cup's Local Organizing Committee (LOC).

Early life and education 
Ayisi Asher was born on 12 February 1976 in Efutu, Central Region. She is an alumna of Our Lady of Apostles (OLA) College of Education and University of Education, Winneba. She holds a master's degree in English literature from the University of Cape Coast.

Employment history 
Before her appointment as member of parliament, she worked as a Form Mistress between 2003 and 2006 with the Ghana Education Service (GES) and also as a House Mistress from 2010 to 2016 at Wesley Girls High School.

Politics 
She is the Deputy Minister for Education in charge of basic schools. She has a foundation called the Barbra Asher Foundation which focuses on reducing the unemployment among youth in her constituency. The Barbra Asher Foundation in collaboration with the Cape coast Technical University's Entrepreneurship Development and Innovation has trained over 200 youth in the Cape Coast constituency in entrepreneurial skills.

Personal life 
She is Christian and attends Victory Bible Church International. She is married and has two children.

References

Living people
Ghanaian MPs 2017–2021
New Patriotic Party politicians
Women members of the Parliament of Ghana
University of Cape Coast alumni
1976 births
University of Education, Winneba alumni
21st-century Ghanaian women politicians